The agile cool-skink or Tasmanian tree skink (Carinascincus pretiosus) is a species of skink in the family Scincidae. It is endemic to Tasmania and the Bass Strait islands.  It is viviparous, and may be found in a wide variety of habitats, from tall forests to rocky coastlines.

References

Carinascincus
Skinks of Australia
Reptiles of Tasmania
Endemic fauna of Tasmania
Reptiles described in 1874
Taxa named by Arthur William Edgar O'Shaughnessy